NGC 6366 is a globular cluster located in the constellation Ophiuchus. It is designated as XI in the galaxy morphological classification scheme and was discovered by the German astronomer Friedrich August Theodor Winnecke on 12 April 1860. It is at a distance of 11,700 light years away from Earth.

NGC 6366 is similar in composition to M 71 or NGC 6342. It is metal-rich for a globular cluster, and all of its stars appears to have formed in the same epoch.

See also 
 List of NGC objects (6001–7000)
 List of NGC objects

References

External links 
 

Globular clusters
6366
Ophiuchus (constellation)
Astronomical objects discovered in 1860